John Kincaid may refer to:
 John Kincaid (politician), United States Representative from Kentucky
 John Kincaid (political scientist), American political scientist
 Sir John Kincaid (British Army officer)

See also
 John Kincade, American sports talk show host